The W. Scott Neal House in Boise, Idaho, was a -story Queen Anne cottage designed by John E. Tourtellotte and constructed in 1897. The house was remodeled by Tourtellotte & Co. prior to 1910, and it was remodeled by Tourtellotte & Hummel in 1914. Tourtellotte & Hummel added a garage in 1916. The house was added to the National Register of Historic Places (NRHP) in 1982. After its listing on the NRHP, the house either was moved or demolished in the 1990s to accommodate an expansion of St. Luke's Boise Medical Center.

W. Scott Neal (January 21, 1862--May 25, 1925) was a farm loan and insurance agent who founded the W. Scott Neal Company, later H.E. Neal & Son. He and Emma (Krall) Neal occupied the W. Scott Neal House soon after their marriage in 1897 until 1924, when they moved to Seattle, Washington.

References

		
National Register of Historic Places in Boise, Idaho
Houses in Boise, Idaho
Queen Anne architecture in Idaho
Buildings and structures completed in 1897